The Virginia Army National Guard is composed of approximately 7000 soldiers and maintains 46 armories in communities throughout Virginia.

The Governor may call individuals or units of the Virginia National Guard into state service during emergencies or to assist in special situations which lend themselves to use of the National Guard. The state mission assigned to the National Guard is:

Virginia Army National Guard units are trained and equipped as part of the United States Army.  The same enlisted ranks and officer ranks and insignia are used and National Guardsmen are eligible to receive all United States military awards. The Virginia Guard also bestows a number of state awards for local services rendered in or to the commonwealth of Virginia.

History
The Virginia Army National Guard is the oldest and the official start of the Army National Guard. The Militia Act of 1903 organized the various state militias into the present National Guard system.

British Colonial Militia

When the first English colonists arrived in America they brought with them an existing militia system developed over centuries. Britain, being an island nation, never had a need to have large standing armies like the countries of mainland Europe. The only threats had to come by sea and in the days of wind-powered ships there was always forewarning, such as during the Spanish Armada in 1588. To be prepared to meet impending threats all men within each county (which usually made up one or more regiments) were required to "muster" or "mobilize" a day or two each year so their names could be entered on the rolls and they could at least familiarize themselves with weapons, usually furnished by the government, stored in a common location called an "armory." The commanders of each of these regiments were the high-born men of the county, often lords of noble birth. The men were told they were expected to turn out when called for an emergency but in reality they were still civilian farmers or shop keepers and only part-time soldiers. Once the crisis passed they returned to their homes and trades. This was the system brought over from England. It was modified once the English arrived because there were constant threats for local natives and Spanish raiders. So part of the militia had to always be armed and in readiness in case of sudden attack.

Virginia State forces
The HHT/2-183rd Cavalry and the 276th Engineer Battalion are two of only nineteen Army National Guard units with campaign credit for the War of 1812.

Virginia State Militia

Virginia National Guard
During the 43 years of the Cold War, many changes occurred in the Virginia Guard, perhaps none more significant than the organization in 1946 of the 149th Fighter Squadron in Sandston, the Commonwealth's first Air National Guard unit. From this point forward when speaking of specific Virginia Guard service, either Army or Air, the following abbreviations will be used:

Virginia Army National Guard-VAARNG
Virginia Air National Guard-VAANG

While many of the pre-war units, such as the 116th Infantry and 111th Field Artillery, were reorganized in the VAARNG in the mid to late 1940s, new units were organized into the force to meet the new threats posed by the Soviets. The most obvious of these were the antiaircraft artillery (AAA) battalions created to defend Washington, D.C., and Hampton Roads from air attack. Initially armed with guns firing "flak" these were, in the mid-1950s, replaced by Nike missiles capable of destroying enemy aircraft before they could hit their targets. And the structure of the state force expanded beyond only combat arms to include specialized support units including military police, medical, transportation, engineers, signal, data processing and even a military history detachment.

In 1959 the 246th Coast Artillery became the 246th Field Artillery, with its 1st and 2d Battalions forming part of the 29th Infantry Division.

Units and formations

Fort Pickett Maneuver Training Center in Blackstone, Virginia
 34th Civil Support Team
 134th Chaplain Support Team
 Camp Pendleton State Military Reservation in Virginia Beach, Virginia
  29th Infantry Division
  116th Infantry Brigade Combat Team – 'Stonewall Brigade'- headquartered in Staunton
  1st Battalion, 116th Infantry Regiment - 'Red Dragons'
  3rd Battalion, 116th Infantry Regiment, headquartered in Winchester
  2nd Squadron (RSTA), 183rd Cavalry Regiment, headquartered in Virginia Beach
  183rd Regiment, Regional Training Institute at Fort Pickett
  1st Battalion, 111th Field Artillery Regiment, headquartered in Norfolk
  229th Brigade Engineer Battalion, headquartered in Fredericksburg
 429th Brigade Support Battalion, headquartered in Danville
  91st Cyber Brigade, headquartered in Bowling Green
 123rd Cyber Protection Battalion, headquartered in Fairfax
 124th Cyber Protection Battalion, headquartered in Fairfax
  329th Regional Support Group, headquartered in Virginia Beach
  276th Engineer Battalion, headquartered in Petersburg
 529th Combat Sustainment Support Battalion, headquartered in Virginia Beach
  1030th Transportation Battalion, headquartered in Gate City
  2nd Battalion, 224th Aviation Regiment, headquartered in Sandston

Duties
National Guard units can be mobilized at any time by presidential order to supplement regular armed forces, and upon declaration of a state of emergency by the governor of the state in which they serve. Unlike Army Reserve members, National Guard members cannot be mobilized individually (except through voluntary transfers and Temporary Duty Assignments TDY), but only as part of their respective units.

Active duty callups
For much of the final decades of the twentieth century, National Guard personnel typically served "One weekend a month, two weeks a year", with a portion working for the Guard in a full-time capacity.  In the first five years of the 21st century, Department of Defense policy was that no Guardsman would be involuntarily activated for a total of more than 24 months (cumulative) in one six-year enlistment period. This policy was due to change on 1 August 2007, with the new policy to state that soldiers will be given 24 months between deployments of no more than 24 months. However, individual states have differing policies.) Since 11 September 2001, over 15,700 Virginia Guard personnel have been deployed.

See also
 Virginia Defense Force
 Virginia Military Institute

References

External links

United States Army National Guard by state
Military in Virginia